Mount Mangengenge is a mountain of the Democratic Republic of the Congo located southeast of Kinshasa, about ten kilometers south of the Ndjili International Airport. It is part of the Crystal Mountains range. The mountain can be reached from the outskirts of the parish of Sainte Angèle de Mérici, along a track hardly passable.

Toponymy
The name Mangengenge derives from the Lingala word kongenge, which means "shining". The mountain was first called Mabangu or Manguele.

History
In June 1885
, the medical doctor Carl Anton Mense (1861–1938) was the first European to climb the mountain. To remember this historical ascent, the mountain was called "pic Mense" for almost a century.

Geography

Religion
The path of the ascent is punctuated with crucifix sculptures with a large cross at the summit. This is because the Bishop of Kinshasa, Frederic Etsou Nzabi Bamungwabi took the initiative in 1992 to make it a spiritual place. Since then, thousands and thousands of pilgrims have climbed the peak.

Tourism
Being the highest point of Kinshasa and a rather beautiful and natural site, the mountain is also a significant tourist spot. There are about 100 foreign tourists ascending it every single month, all year round.

World Cleanup Day
A couple of participants of the World Cleanup Day collected garbage left by pilgrims and tourists for the first time in September 2019. Their aim is to keep doing it two or three times a year. They hope that other tourists and pilgrims will start doing it as well.

Gallery

References

External links
 Le Mont Mangengenge

Kinshasa
Mountains of the Democratic Republic of the Congo